Tiron may refer to:

Tiron (chemical), a chemical compound
Thiron-Gardais, also called Tiron, a commune in northern France